Queen Mab was part of the first pair of English-bred Thoroughbred horses imported to the Province of Maryland in 1747 by Provincial Governor of Maryland, Samuel Ogle.

Queen Mab was given to Ogle by Lord Baltimore during Ogle's trip to England in 1740.  The importation of Queen Mab and Spark established the Belair Stud legacy.

References

Thoroughbred racehorses
Racehorses bred in the United Kingdom